The Sir Sandford Range is a subrange of the Big Bend Ranges of the Selkirk Mountains of the Columbia Mountains in southeastern British Columbia, Canada, located between Gold (river) and Palmer Creek just southwest of the Gold Arm of Kinbasket Lake.

The range is named for Sir Sandford Fleming, who was engineer-in-chief of the Canadian Pacific Railway. He was the first to advocate twenty-four-hour day standard time for railways.

References

Big Bend Ranges